The 2022 UCI Track Cycling Nations Cup (also known as the Tissot UCI Track Cycling Nations Cup for sponsorship reasons) was a multi-race tournament over a track cycling season. It was the second series of the UCI Track Cycling Nations Cup organised by the UCI.

Series 
Three rounds are scheduled:
 April 21–24 in Glasgow, United Kingdom.
 May 12–15 in Milton, Ontario, Canada.
 July 7–10 in Cali, Colombia.

Standings

Men 

Sprint

Team Sprint

Individual Pursuit

Team Pursuit

1 km Time Trial

Keirin

Omnium

Elimination

Madison

Women 

Sprint

Team Sprint

Individual Pursuit

Team Pursuit

500 m Time Trial

Keirin

Omnium

Elimination

Madison

Overall team standings 
Overall team standings are calculated based on total number of points gained by the team's riders in each event.

Results

Men

Women

Medal table

References 

Nations Cup
UCI Track Cycling Nations Cup
UCI Track Cycling Nations Cup
UCI
UCI
UCI
UCI
UCI Track Cycling Nations Cup